Erste Group Bank AG (Erste Group) is an Austrian financial service provider in Central and Eastern Europe serving 15.7 million clients in over 2,700 branches in seven countries.

History

Erste Group was founded in October 1819 as Erste österreichische Spar-Casse in Leopoldstadt, a suburb of Vienna. After the demise of communism, the company started a strong expansion into Central and Eastern Europe and by 2008 it had acquired 10 banks. In 1997, it went public and today the company is listed on the exchanges of Vienna, Prague and Bucharest and included in the indices CEETX, ATX and PX.

On 9 August 2008 the former Erste Bank Oesterreich was split up into the newly founded holding company Erste Group Bank AG and the subsidiary Erste Bank der österreichischen Sparkassen AG; the foreign subsidiaries were taken over by the new holding company. Erste Group now includes all companies of the Group.

The IPO in Vienna in 1997 was carried out by what was then the unitary Erste Bank (see link), which was also the institution which carried out further capital increases up until 2006, as well as a share split. Some of these transactions were the largest of their kind ever carried out in Vienna as a financial center. The capital generated by these transactions was used to finance acquisitions. On 18 July 2013 Erste Group successfully completed a capital increase in the amount of EUR 660.6 million. Erste Group shares are listed on the Vienna, Prague and Bucharest stock exchanges. Erste Group Bank AG is the most heavily weighted component of the "ATX" share index, which tracks the blue-chip shares traded on the Vienna Stock Exchange. (25 June 2018)

In 2017, Erste Group received the "Best Bank in Central and Eastern Europe" award from Euromoney. That year, the publication also named Erste Group's subsidiary banks in Austria, the Czech Republic and Montenegro "Best Bank" in their respective markets, while it honored Group subsidiary Banca Comerciala Romana (BCR) in Romania as "Best Bank Transformation in Central and Eastern Europe".

In a ranking by Forbes Magazine of the world's largest stock corporations in 2013, Erste Group Bank came in 672nd place and was third among Austrian companies.

Expanding into Central and Eastern Europe since 1997
Erste Bank has been formed after the merger of GiroCredit Bank AG, Die Erste österreichische Spar-Casse AG (and some smaller institutions) in 1997. After restructuring and going public in November 1997, Erste Bank – at the time the uniform organization – embarked on its expansion strategy into Central and Eastern Europe. The first takeover was the Hungarian Mezőbank in 1997 (which was privatised by GiroCredit). After carrying out another capital increase, the expansion continued. In 2000, majority stakes were acquired in the Czech Česká spořitelna and in the Slovak Slovenská sporiteľňa.

Also in 2000, three small Croatian banks were merged to create Erste & Steiermärkische Bank d.d., following their takeovers as of 1997 by Erste Bank and the Steiermärkische Bank und Sparkassen AG.

In 2003, Riječka banka was merged with Erste & Steiermärkische Bank. The stake owned by Erste in these subsidiaries has been 55.1% ever since.

The acquisition of 61.88% in Banca Comercială Română S.A. (BCR), the largest Romanian bank with 2.8, million customers and 12,000 employees, for EUR 3.751 billion in 2005 was the largest foreign direct investment ever by an Austrian enterprise. The number of the employees at the end of 2008 was 9,985.

In July 2005, Erste Bank signed the purchase agreement for the acquisition of 83.28% of the shares in Novosadska banka a.d., Novi Sad, from the Republic of Serbia. With the acquisition of the bank, Erste Bank entered the Serbian market which promises enormous growth potential.

In 2007, Erste acquired 100% of Bank Prestige in Ukraine, its first business venture in the country. In April 2013, Erste Group sold its Ukrainian subsidiary for around EUR 63 million to the owners of the Ukrainian Fidobank. The sale was in line with Erste Group's strategy to focus on the retail business in the eastern part of the European Union. Ukraine been growing more and more distant from the EU politically in the last few years, and therefore, no longer fit into the strategy of the banking group.

In 2008, the foreign business of Erste Bank was transferred to the newly founded Erste Group.

Subsidiaries in Central and Eastern Europe

The holding company Erste Group Bank AG operates local banks in seven countries in Central and Eastern Europe:

Austria: Erste Bank der oesterreichischen Sparkassen AG
Czech Republic: Česká spořitelna a.s.
Slovakia: Slovenská sporiteľňa, a.s.
Hungary: Erste Bank Hungary Zrt.
Croatia: Erste & Steiermärkische Bank d.d.
Serbia: Erste Bank a.d. Novi Sad
Romania: Banca Comercială Română

Other financial institutions with the share of Erste Group:
Montenegro: Erste Bank AD Podgorica
Slovenia: Slovenia Banka Sparkasse d.d.
Poland: Erste Securities Polska

Effects of the financial crisis
In October 2011 it said it expected a full year loss of up to EUR 1.1 billion, after making writedowns and provisions of EUR 1.6 billion. This would be its first loss since at least 1988. It said the writedowns were due to government intervention in Hungary, where it is forced to take losses on Swiss franc mortgages, and a slower than expected recovery in Romania. It will also delay a plan to repay some of the state aid received in 2009. 
In August 2013, Erste Group Bank AG was the first Austrian bank to fully repay the participation capital of EUR 1.76 billion issued in 2009 which consisted of EUR 1.22 billion from the Republic of Austria and EUR 540 million from private investors. From 2009 to 2012, the Republic of Austria received annual dividend payments from Erste Group of EUR 98 million and private investors of EUR 43 million. Including the pro rata dividend for 2013 which paid in June 2014 after the corresponding resolution is passed by the annual shareholders' meeting, the Republic of Austria received EUR 448 million and private investors EUR 198 million in dividends.

During the 2014 stress test (finance) of the European Banking Authority (EBA), Erste Group Bank AG's equity ratio reached 11.2% under the normal scenario and 7.6% under the negative scenario, so that Erste Group passed the stress test as expected. As of year end 2015, Erste Group achieved a net profit of EUR 968.2 million, 4.2% lending growth and a CET 1 ratio of 12.3%.

Online Banking George
In January 2015, Erste introduced its digital banking platform "George" in Austria. George was launched in Slovakia and in the Czech Republic in 2017, in Romania in 2018, in Croatia in 2020 and in Hungary in 2021. According to Erste Group, there were approximately 4 million George users in the first four markets by the end of 2018, and more than 5 million in 2021.

Headquarters Erste Campus
In the spring of 2016, 4.500 employees of Erste Group, of Erste Bank Oesterreich and their subsidiaries in Vienna moved to their new headquarters "Erste Campus". The cornerstone had been laid on 26 June 2012. The headquarter is located on the area of the former Südbahnhof and is the first building complex of "Quartier Belvedere" to be completed. Once it is finished, the new district will be a mix of company buildings, apartments, parks, cultural spaces, shops and restaurants.

Initial public offering, capital increases, acquisitions

The initial public offering was carried out in Vienna in 1997 by the – at time uniform – organization Erste Bank, which also carried out further capital increases until 2006 and one stock split. Some of these transactions were the largest of their kind ever on the financial market in Vienna. The capital raised was used to finance acquisitions. On 18 July 2013, Erste Group successfully completed a capital increase of EUR 660.6 million. The Erste Group share is listed on the exchanges of Vienna, Prague and Bucharest.

Shareholders

Effective 30 June 2016, the shareholders were:
11.52% Sparkassenbeteiligungs GmbH & Co KG
5.78% ERSTE Foundation direct 
5,62% Retail Investors
4.9% BlackRock
4.08% Vienna Insurance Group
3.71% Unidentified
2.78% Foundations
1.07% Identified Trading
60.54% Institutional Investors

Free float: 75.84%

References

External links

Vienna Stock Exchange: Erste Group Bank AG

Banks established in 2008
Banks of Austria
Austrian brands
Companies listed on the Wiener Börse
Companies based in Vienna
Banks under direct supervision of the European Central Bank
Austrian companies established in 2008
Multinational companies headquartered in Austria